Krukówek  is a village in the administrative district of Gmina Raczki, within Suwałki County, Podlaskie Voivodeship in north-eastern Poland. The village has a population of 67.

References

Villages in Suwałki County